Rhysida celeris, the blue-legged centipede, is a species of centipede in the subfamily Otostigminae. It is found across Latin America and the Caribbean islands. It is one of the most common and widespread species of its genus in the neotropical region, and sometimes enters houses. It can be found at a variety of altitudes, from sea level to mountains 1250 m above sea level.

Appearance 
Amazonas Chagas-Júnior described the colouration of the centipede thus: "General body color light blue or olive green,  sternites and legs light blue or yellowish; prefemur and femur of the ultimate legs light blue, sometimes tibiae and tarsi are pale."

Its antennae are flexible, and long, and are divided into 17 to 21 segments. The first three segments of the antennae are hairless, the remaining ones are densely bristly. Its head (cephalic plate) is slightly wider than long, and smooth except for a median groove.

Rhysida celeris can be distinguished from Rhysida brasiliensis, a morphologically similar species, by the sutures on its segments and the length of the ultimate legs.

References

External links 

 Original decription 

celeris
Animals described in 1870